Helmut Wolber (born 6 July 1947) is a German rower. He competed in the men's quadruple sculls event at the 1976 Summer Olympics.

References

1947 births
Living people
German male rowers
Olympic rowers of West Germany
Rowers at the 1976 Summer Olympics
Rowers from Cologne